The Lakeland Renegades are an American Rugby league football team based in Lakeland, Florida who play in the Southern Conference of the USA Rugby League. They were founded in 2019.

See also

Rugby league in the United States

References

External links

USA Rugby League teams
Sports teams in Florida
Sports in Lakeland, Florida
Rugby clubs established in 2019
2019 establishments in Florida
Rugby league in Florida